Magic shop may refer to:

 Magic store, an establishment which sells materials for performing magic tricks
 Magic Shop (series), a series of children's books by Bruce Coville
 Tannen's Magic Shop, a magic shop in New York City
 "Magic Shop", a song by BTS from the album Love Yourself: Tear
 "The Magic Shop", a 1903 short story by H. G Wells